Cerion saetiae is a species of terrestrial gastropod in the family Cerionidae endemic to coastal areas on Saetia Key, Cuba. The type locality harbours few specimens, yet new locality records have found more remains despite a concerning decline in live individuals. This species is found in coastal sea-grape and sand-vegetation habitats on Playita de Fidel, Playa del Cristo and Baracutey Beach.

References 

Cerionidae
Invertebrates of Cuba
Gastropods described in 1948
Endemic fauna of Cuba